"Shinin' on Me" is a song co-written and recorded by American country music artist Jerrod Niemann.  It was released in April 2012 as the first single from his album Free the Music. Niemann wrote the song with Lee Brice, Rob Hatch and Lance Miller while on tour with Brad Paisley.

The song received generally positive reviews from critics who praised the production and Niemann's relaxed performance. "Shinin' on Me" peaked at number 17 on both the Billboard Country Airplay and Hot Country Songs charts respectively. It also charted at number 92 on the Hot 100. The accompanying music video for the song was directed by Chris Hicky and features Niemann hanging out at a restaurant called "The Family Wash."

Critical reception
Billy Dukes of Taste of Country gave the song two and a half stars out of five, writing that "there is little new to be excited about." Matt Bjorke of Roughstock gave the song four stars out of five, saying that "the melody is infectious and inviting as is Jerrod’s strong affinity to providing something instantly recognizable and different from everything else on country radio." The song also received a B+ from Kevin John Coyne of Country Universe, who wrote that Niemann "has a laid-back lyric and personable vocal performance to go with the cool instrumentation."

Music video
The music video was directed by Chris Hicky and premiered in May 2012. It was filmed at The Family Wash in East Nashville.

Chart performance
"Shinin' on Me" debuted at number 60 on the U.S. Billboard Hot Country Songs chart for the week of March 17, 2012. It also debuted at number 94 on the U.S. Billboard Hot 100 chart for the week of September 15, 2012.

Year-end charts

References

2012 singles
2012 songs
Jerrod Niemann songs
Arista Nashville singles
Songs written by Lee Brice
Music videos directed by Chris Hicky
Songs written by Jerrod Niemann
Songs written by Rob Hatch
Songs written by Lance Miller